Henry Loftus may refer to:

 Henry Loftus and Harry Donaldson, two men who made headlines for their unsuccessful attempt to rob the Southern Pacific Railroad's Apache Limited in 1937
 Henry Loftus, 1st Earl of Ely (1709–1783), Irish peer and politician